Carmon is a surname. Notable people with the surname include:

Amalia Kahana-Carmon, Israeli writer
Arye Carmon, Israeli academic
Dominic Carmon, American Roman Catholic prelate
Irin Carmon, Israel-American blogger
Tim Carmon, American keyboardist
Yigal Carmon, founder of Middle East Media Research Institute
Yosef Carmon, Israeli actor
Ziv Carmon, Israeli academic

See also
Carman, surname
Carmen (surname)
Carmin (disambiguation), includes list of people with name Carmin